Estola obscura is a species of beetle in the family Cerambycidae. It was described by Johan Christian Fabricius in 1792. It is known from Brazil and French Guiana.

References

Estola
Beetles described in 1792